Branded is the twelfth album by the German hard rock band Bonfire. It was released in 2011 by LZ Records and Sony Music.  This is the first full album to be released with Bonfire's original drummer, Dominik Huelshorst, back behind the drum kit for the band. Two extra tracks were included, acoustic versions of "I Need You" (from the Strike Ten album) and "Rivers Of Glory" (from the Knock Out album) that were recorded in 2011 with Claus Lessmann and Hans Ziller playing acoustic guitars and Chiara Ziller (Hans' daughter) on piano.

Track listing

Band members
Claus Lessmann - lead vocals, rhythm guitar
Hans Ziller - lead, rhythm & acoustic guitars
Chris Limburg - guitars
Uwe Köhler - bass
Dominik Huelshorst - drums, percussion

Bonfire (band) albums
2011 albums